PS Warna Agung was an Indonesian football club based in  Jakarta. The team plays in The Indonesian Liga Sepakbola Utama - Galatama.

Former players

Former Coach
 Endang Witarsa

References

Football clubs in Indonesia
Association football clubs established in 1971
1971 establishments in Indonesia
Defunct football clubs in Indonesia